"I Think" (stylized in all caps) is a song by American rapper Tyler, the Creator, released as the third track from his fifth studio album Igor (2019). The song features additional vocals from American singer Solange, as well as background vocals from singers Ryan Beatty, Anthony Evans, Amanda Brown and Tiffany Stevenson.

The song was recorded in Lake Como, Italy.

Composition
In the song, Tyler, the Creator questions his feelings and a relationship he has, stating: "I don't know where I'm going / But I know what I'm showing / Feelings, that's what I'm pouring / What the fuck is your motive?" He also makes a reference to the novel turned film Call Me by Your Name ("Man, I wish you would call me / By your name cause I'm sorry").

Music video
A music video for the song was released on October 24, 2019. Directed by Tyler, the Creator (under his alias Wolf Haley), the video is about two minutes long. It opens in a bathroom, where a group of people are playing dice and a couple comes out of a stall. Tyler, wearing a pastel "color-block" suit, blonde wig and shades, observes himself in the mirror. He is shoved out of the bathroom by dice players. After brushing himself off, he chases after someone of his affection, moving through a crowd at a dance party. Eventually, Tyler gives up and goes for taking pictures. Kendall Jenner makes a cameo, as one of the attendees posing for pictures. Wyatt and Fletcher Shears of The Garden (band) also make an appearance as people having their photo taken. Tyler becomes lonely, until the man he was looking for comes and taps him on the shoulder. Tyler looks up, and the video ends.

Charts

Certifications

References

2019 songs
Tyler, the Creator songs
Songs written by Tyler, the Creator